Kanseyt Abdezuly is a Kazakhstani philologist. He is a Dean and Professor of the Philology faculty in Al-Farabi Kazakh National University. He is a member of the Writers' Union of Kazakhstan, a body of the country's elite writers.

References

Kazakhstani philologists
Living people
Academic staff of Al-Farabi Kazakh National University
Year of birth missing (living people)
Place of birth missing (living people)